Mount Apolotok is a high, prominent red granite peak, 2,555 m, in the Salamander Range, Freyberg Mountains in Victoria Land, Antarctica. The name is of Eskimo origin, meaning "the big red one," and was given by the Northern Party of New Zealand Geological Survey Antarctic Expedition (NZGSAE), 1963–64. The mountain lies on the Pennell Coast, a portion of Antarctica lying between Cape Williams and Cape Adare.

Mountains of Victoria Land
Pennell Coast